Patrick Daniel Yee Parcon is the current serving bishop of the Roman Catholic Diocese of Talibon, Philippines.

Early life and education

Parcon was born on 24 November 1962 in Vallehermoso, Negros Oriental.  He studied Bachelor of Science in Chemistry from Silliman University.  He completed his philosophical studies from St. Joseph Seminary in Sibulan, Negros Oriental, and theological formation from St. Joseph Regional Seminary in Iloilo City. He also acquired a master's degree in Religion & Religious Education with core specialization in Christian Spirituality from Fordham University in New York City.

Priesthood

Parcon was ordained a priest for the Roman Catholic Diocese of San Carlos (Philippines) on 24 April 1994.

Episcopate

Parcon was appointed bishop of the Roman Catholic Diocese of Talibon on 3 June 2014 to succeed the Most Rev. Christian Vicente Noel who retired and he ordained a bishop on 22 August 2014 by Archbishop José S. Palma together with Bishop Gerardo Alminaza and Archbishop Jose Advincula and Installed as Bishop of Talibon on August 26, 2014 by Archbishop Giuseppe Pinto

References

1962 births
People from Negros Oriental
21st-century Roman Catholic bishops in the Philippines
Living people
Fordham University alumni